Dascyllus reticulatus, known commonly as the reticulate dascyllus or two-stripe damselfish among other vernacular names, is a species of marine fish in the family Pomacentridae.

Reticulate dascyllus is widespread throughout the tropical waters of the central Indo-Pacific region.

Description
A small marine fish that reaches  in length. It is grey with two vertical stripes, and a blue-green tail.

In the aquarium

Dascyllus melanurus is a hardy member of a saltwater aquarium. Because of this and its usually low price it may be recommended as a way for novice marine aquarium keepers to gain experience in the hobby.  is typically quoted as the minimum tank size required to permanently house this fish.

It is an aggressive fish, even when compared to many damselfish, and will often harass similarly sized fish. It is also territorial with members of its own species, and with new additions to a tank. This will often make it difficult to add other small fish to an aquarium. It is however reef safe and will not harm invertebrates. Despite its hardy nature care should be taken when placing one with larger predatory fish such as lion fish, and grouper which may eat it. As an adult, however, its aggressive nature will often protect it from any fish that cannot fit it in its mouth.

It is very similar to Dascyllus carneus. They have similar behavior in aquarium tank. As it grows up, it will become very aggressive. They chase small peaceful fishes but avoid to provoke ferocious fishes.

References

http://www.marinespecies.org/aphia.php?p=taxdetails&id=212844
liveaquaria.com Page on Two Stripe Damselfish

External links
 

reticulatus
Fish described in 1846